Jeffrey Allan Nelson (born November 17, 1966) is an American former baseball relief pitcher and current broadcaster who played 15 years in Major League Baseball (MLB). He batted and threw right-handed. Nelson retired on January 12, 2007, the same day he signed a minor league contract with the New York Yankees.

In his MLB career Nelson pitched in 798 games with a 48–45 record, and with runners in scoring position and two out he held batters to a .191 batting average.  In 55 post-season games (third all-time), he compiled a 2–3 mark with 62 strikeouts and a 2.65 ERA in 54.1 innings.  Among hitters whom he dominated most were Troy Glaus, who in 14 at-bats was hitless with 11 strikeouts.

Nelson had three stints with the Seattle Mariners (1992–1995, 2001–2003 and again in 2005). He is Seattle's all-time record holder for most games pitched (383), and has a 23–20 record with the Mariners. Nelson is currently a television color analyst for the Miami Marlins and New York Yankees.

Early life and career
Nelson grew up in Maryland and played baseball and basketball at Catonsville High School.

Drafted by the Los Angeles Dodgers in the 22nd round of the 1984 MLB draft, he signed on June 21, 1984. In 1986, he was selected by the Seattle Mariners in the minor league phase of the Rule 5 draft.

Major league career
Nelson made his major league debut with the Mariners on April 16, 1992, against the Chicago White Sox at Comiskey Park. He pitched two scoreless innings of relief.

On July 13, 1995, Nelson entered a game against the Toronto Blue Jays with two runners on base and no outs. Nelson threw one pitch to Sandy Martínez and induced a ground ball triple play. He became the first pitcher in the era for which pitch count data is available to throw only one pitch in an outing and be credited with pitching a full inning.

In December 1995, the Mariners traded Nelson, Tino Martinez, and Jim Mecir to the New York Yankees for Russ Davis and Sterling Hitchcock. With the Yankees, Nelson was a member of the World Series champions in 1996, 1998, 1999, and 2000.

In that season he made the American League All-Star team. Nelson's All-Star selection was considered an innovative move by AL manager Joe Torre, as Nelson's role of middle relief was traditionally overlooked during All-Star selection.

From 2001 to 2003, he formed the right side of Seattle's potent lefty/righty setup squad along with left-handed pitcher Arthur Rhodes. In 2001, he held opposing batters to a .136 batting average and a .199 slugging percentage, and .074/.110 once he had two strikes on them.

On August 6, 2003, the Mariners traded Nelson to the Yankees for Armando Benitez. The Yankees lost to the Florida Marlins in the World Series and once again Nelson left the Yankees.

In , Nelson appeared in 29 games for the Texas Rangers, going 1–2 with a 5.32 ERA. He was on the disabled list twice with an assortment of injuries to his right knee and right elbow.

Before the  season, the Seattle Mariners signed Nelson to a minor league contract, his third stint with the club.

In the  offseason, Nelson signed a minor-league contract with the St. Louis Cardinals, but was released before the season began. He was then picked up by the White Sox.

Surgery
On June 8, 2006, Nelson announced that he would undergo surgery, to relieve a nerve in his right elbow, that was likely to mark the end of Nelson's active baseball career. Following the operation on his pitching elbow, on May 10, 2007, there was controversy when he tried to sell bone chips from his elbow, removed in the operation, on eBay who cancelled the auction. Nelson, whose daughters attended The Bear Creek School, were going to give half the proceeds to the school and half to the Curtis Williams Foundation.

Nelson signed a minor league contract with the Yankees in January 2007 so that he could officially retire as a Yankee.

Pitching
Nelson was a respected slider specialist, much more effective against right-handed batters than against lefties (who batted 55 points higher, and slugged 106 points higher, against him than did righties).   He was also known for his three-quarters sidearm delivery, and threw a cut 90-MPH fastball as well. During his Yankees tenure, he was known for faking a throw to third and then faking a throw to first in the same motion, so as to avoid balking. This was and still is referred to as "the old Jeff Nelson" by Yankees play-by-play broadcaster Michael Kay.

Broadcasting
Nelson has filled in on sports radio KJR-AM in Seattle and also worked as an analyst for MLB.com during the 2010 post-season.

In 2016, Nelson joined Fox Sports' pre-game broadcast team for Miami Marlins. In 2019, Nelson served as a game analyst for the YES Network, calling occasional games for his former team. On July 12, 2019, Nelson began appearing on the YES Network's pregame show. He substituted for Suzyn Waldman on WFAN broadcasts of the final games of the Yankees regular season in October 2022, working with John Sterling.

References

External links

Pelota Binaria (Venezuelan Winter League)

1966 births
Living people
American expatriate baseball players in Canada
American League All-Stars
Bakersfield Dodgers players
Baseball players from Baltimore
Calgary Cannons players
Cardenales de Lara players
American expatriate baseball players in Venezuela
CCBC–Catonsville Cardinals baseball players
Charlotte Knights players
Chicago White Sox players
Everett AquaSox players
Frisco RoughRiders players
Great Falls Dodgers players
Gulf Coast Dodgers players
Gulf Coast Yankees players
Jacksonville Suns players
Major League Baseball pitchers
New York Yankees players
Oklahoma RedHawks players
Peninsula Pilots players
Salinas Spurs players
San Bernardino Spirit players
Seattle Mariners players
Baseball players from Seattle
Tampa Yankees players
Texas Rangers players
Williamsport Bills players